Mauritania elects on the national level a head of state – the president – and a legislature. Prior to 2006, the president was elected for a six-year term by the people, with no term limits; following the constitutional referendum of June 2006, presidential terms are now five years, with a two-term limit and a maximum age limit of 75. The Parliament (Barlamane/Parlement) has one chamber. The National Assembly (Al Jamiya al-Wataniyah/Assemblée Nationale) has 81 members, elected for a five-year term in single-seat constituencies.

Latest elections

Presidential elections

Parliamentary elections

See also
Electoral calendar
Electoral system

External links
Adam Carr's Election Archive
African Elections Database